Enoplocerus is a genus of longhorn beetles in the subfamily Prioninae of the family Cerambycidae. It is monotypic, being represented by the single species Enoplocerus armillatus, commonly known as the giant longhorn beetle or imperious sawyer.

Description
Enoplocerus armillatus exhibits strong sexual dimorphism and is one of the largest Cerambycids. Males have impressive and large mandibles. This species is characterized by very long black antennae, pale brown elytra, quite thick forelegs, and four sharp spines on both sides of the prothorax. It has diurnal habits and it is frugivorous and attracted by tree exudates, while larvae are root borers, feeding on decaying materials.

Distribution and habitat
Enoplocerus armillatus can be found from Costa Rica to Argentina and Brazil.

Gallery

References
 Biolib
 F. Vitali armillatus Cerambycoidea
 Checklist of the Cerambycidae, or longhorned beetles (Coleoptera) of the Western Hemisphere
 Laura Rosado-Douglas Sobre algunas localidades colombianas para conocer y estudiar a Callipogon lemoinei (Reiche) y Enoplocerus armillatum (L.)

Prioninae
Beetles described in 1767
Taxa named by Carl Linnaeus